Georgios Cheimonetos (born 29 December 1972) is a Greek former cyclist. He competed at the 1996 Summer Olympics and the 2004 Summer Olympics.

References

External links
 

1972 births
Living people
Greek male cyclists
Olympic cyclists of Greece
Cyclists at the 1996 Summer Olympics
Cyclists at the 2004 Summer Olympics
People from Rhodes
Sportspeople from the South Aegean
20th-century Greek people
21st-century Greek people